The KN-06 is a North Korean surface-to-air missile system.  The system was first shown publicly at the 65th anniversary of the Workers’ Party of Korea on October 10, 2010.

Design
The KN-06 is a long-range SAM that bears resemblance to the Russian S-300 and Chinese FT-2000. Imagery of missile launch tubes shows they are larger in diameter, but shorter than the S-300's missiles. The missiles are mounted on locally produced, stretched 6X6 KamAZ 55111 (Taebaeksan 96) launcher trucks, with each holding three missile tubes. The system is equipped with a Flap Lid type phased array radar.

Development
A test launch occurred in June 2011. Another test launch, attended by Kim Jong-Un was reported on 2 April 2016. As of May 2017, it was reportedly still undergoing testing.

Deployment
The system underwent final testing on May 28, 2017 with KCNA reporting that 'glitches' previously identified during testing had been resolved. It said the new system would be mass-produced and deployed across the country.

As many as 156 KN-06 launchers could be operational according to the Center for Strategic and International Studies.

Operators

See also 
S-300VM
S-300
HQ-9
HQ-16
Bavar 373
Sayyad-2
TK-3

References

Surface-to-air missiles of North Korea
Military equipment introduced in the 2010s